Adam Fenton (born 8 February 1972) is an English record producer and DJ who has worked across various genres. He is also the co-founder of the drum and bass label Breakbeat Kaos along with DJ Fresh. He found initial success with the 1990s drum and bass singles "Circles", "Metropolis" / "Mother Earth", and "F-Jam", before releasing his debut studio album Colours in 1997. In 2001, he transitioned into hip hop music, producing the album Kaos: The Anti-Acoustic Warfare, featuring collaborations with LL Cool J, Redman and De La Soul. He later released a remix album, Drum and Bass Warfare, and collaborated with DJ Fresh.

Career
Adam began his career with his early release, the techstep 12", "Metropolis" / "Mother Earth", released in 1996 on the Metalheadz record label. His other early successes were the tracks "F-Jam" and "Circles" (the latter breaking into the Top 20 in the UK Singles Chart). In 1998 he won a MOBO award for his debut album, Colours.

In 2001, he found success in the field of hip hop, primarily with Kaos: The Anti-Acoustic Warfare, working alongside artists such as LL Cool J, Redman and De La Soul. In 2002, Adam created the score for the feature film Ali G Indahouse starring Sacha Baron Cohen for Working Title Films.

He is founder and co-owner of the UK independent record label Breakbeat Kaos, which released Pendulum's album Hold Your Colour; he is also co-owner of the drum and bass website Dogs on Acid.

In early 2007 he was cast in his first film role, the crime thriller The Heavy. In December 2007, Adam also co-starred in Cuckoo, a thriller about sound and lies, co-starring Richard E. Grant and Laura Fraser, directed by Richard Bracewell.

2009 saw Adam back in the studio, this time with Horx to remix The Prodigy's "Take Me to the Hospital" from their album Invaders Must Die. Months later, Adam collaborated with Horx again to release "Shut The Lights Off" with Redman. Adam F and DJ Fresh's 2010 collaboration single under the artist name WTF?! was next, built around Dead Prez's "Hip Hop". Over the past few years Adam has remixed David Guetta, Rihanna, Afrojack, Missy Elliott, Sander van Doorn and Scrufizzer.
   
Returning to the studio in recent years, Adam's "In The Air" collaboration with Sonic C was released as a free download and supported by Annie Mac, MistaJam, Zinc, A-Trak and Zeds Dead. It set the scene for "When The Rain Is Gone", Adam's first official single release under his own name for some time. The single was released in 2012 on 3Beat.

Adam later released his Elements EP on Breakbeat Kaos. It included the tracks "Elements", "When The Rain Is Gone", "In The Air", "It's Bigger Than Hip Hop UK" and his remixes of Afrojack's "Take Over Control" and Sander van Doorn's "Nothing Inside".

Adam's most recent output was in the form of "See You Again", a collaboration with DJ Fresh featuring Michael Warren which was on Fresh's album Nextlevelism. He has also recently collaborated with British electronic music producer Doctor P and Method Man, who is also known for his collaborations with Redman, to produce the late-2013 track "The Pit".

Family
His father was the pop singer and actor Alvin Stardust.

Discography

Studio albums
 Colours (1997)
 Kaos: The Anti-Acoustic Warfare (2001)

Remix albums
 Drum and Bass Warfare (2002)

Film scores
 Ali G Indahouse (2002), Working Title Films and Universal Pictures

Singles and EPs
 1995: "Circles" [Section 5]
 1996: "Before Today" / Adam F Remix  Everything But the Girl Virgin 
 1996: "Aromatherapy" [Section 5]
 1996: "Metropolis" / "Mother Earth" [Metalheadz]
 1997: "Telling Lies" / Adam F Mix  David Bowie BMG/Arista
 1997: "F-Jam" (featuring MC Conrad) [F-Jams] – UK No. 122
 1997: "Circles" [F-Jams] – UK No. 20
 1998: "Music in My Mind" [F-Jams] – UK No. 27
 2001: "Stand Clear" (featuring M.O.P.) [EMI] – UK No. 43
 2002: "Where's My..?" (featuring Lil' Mo) [EMI] – UK No. 37
 2002: "Metrosound" (with J Majik) [Kaos] – UK No. 54
 2002: "Stand Clear" (Remixes) (featuring M.O.P.) [Kaos] – UK No. 50
 2002: "Smash Sumthin" (featuring Redman) [Kaos] – UK No. 11
 2002: "Dirty Harry's Revenge" (featuring Beenie Man) [Kaos] – UK No. 50
 2005: "Eightball" / "Original Junglesound" [Breakbeat Kaos] – UK No. 93
 2009: "Take Me to the Hospital" / Adam F & Horx Remix  The Prodigy XL Recordings  
 2009: "Shut the Lights Off!" (with Horx featuring Redman) [Breakbeat Kaos]
 2012: "When the Rain Is Gone" [3Beat]
 2012: Elements [Breakbeat Kaos]
 2013: "The Pit" (with Doctor P featuring Method Man) [Circus]
 2015: "Believer" (with DJ Fresh) [Ministry of Sound] – UK No. 58
 2016: "Harmony" (with Kokiri featuring Rae) [Sony Music Entertainment]

Featured artists
 "When the Sun Goes Down" (with DJ Fresh) (2005) UK No. 69
 "See You Again" (with DJ Fresh featuring Michael Warren) (2012)

References

External links
 

1972 births
Astralwerks artists
Living people
Big beat musicians
British hip hop DJs
DJs from Liverpool
English electronic musicians
Musicians from Liverpool
English drum and bass musicians
English record producers
Electronic dance music DJs